Gordon Marlborough Patrick (9 November 1897 – 14 January 1964) was a New Zealand cricketer who played for Otago.

Patrick made a single first-class appearance for the team, during the 1918–1919 season, against Southland. From the lower-middle order, he scored 2 runs in the first innings in which he batted, and a duck in the second.

See also
 List of Otago representative cricketers

External links
GM Patrick at Cricket Archive 

New Zealand cricketers
Otago cricketers
1897 births
1964 deaths
Cricketers from Christchurch